Kudachi (Rural)  is an urban area in the southern state of Karnataka, India. It is located in the Raybag taluk of Belgaum district in Karnataka.

Demographics
At the 2001 India census, Kudachi (rural) had a population of 13,733 with 7,232 males and 6501 females.

See also
 Kudachi
 Belgaum
 Districts of Karnataka

References

External links
 http://Belgaum.nic.in/

Villages in Belagavi district